Casa pueblo may refer to:
 Casa del pueblo (Spanish: House of the people), in Spain, this usually refers to a typical local branch office of both the PSOE and the Unión General de Trabajadores
 Casa Pueblo, a non-profit environmental watchdog community-based organization in Puerto Rico.
 Casapueblo, a citadel-sculpture in Uruguay.

See also
 Pueblo de Casas Grandes, a municipality in Mexico
 House of the People (disambiguation)
 People's House (disambiguation)